Theodore Henry Isley (October 31, 1912 – September 19, 2004) was an Ontario farmer and politician. He served as on the Waterloo Township council, and then as deputy reeve before being elected to a term in the Ontario legislature as an Ontario Co-operative Commonwealth Federation MPP by winning the Waterloo South seat in the 1948 provincial election. He was defeated in the subsequent 1951 provincial election, in which the CCF fell to two seats from 21 in the previous election. In 1952, he was elected president of the Ontario CCF defeating William Horace Temple.

Isley also served as the last reeve of Waterloo Township from 1962 to 1971, when it was amalgamated into the Regional Municipality of Waterloo.

Electoral record

Federal

References

1915 births
2004 deaths
Canadian farmers
Ontario Co-operative Commonwealth Federation MPPs
20th-century Canadian politicians
People from the Regional Municipality of Waterloo
Mayors of places in Ontario